Annus is an Estonian language meaning "dose", or "batch".

As of 1 January 2021, 219 men and 251 in Estonia have the surname Annus. Annus is ranked the 251st most common surname for men in Estonia and 237th for women. The surname Annus is most common in Lääne-Viru County, where 6.81 per 10,000 inhabitants of the county bear the surname. 

Notable people bearing the surname Annus include:

Epp Annus (born 1969), writer and literary scholar
Endel Annus (2015–2011), bibliographer
Lembit Annus (1941–2018), communist party figure
Maria Annus (born 1979), actress
Olev Annus (born 1951), bodybuilder
Rednar Annus (born 1970), actor and director
Ruth Annus (born 1973), civil servant and translator
Toomas Annus (born 1960), entrepreneur
Uku Annus (1947–2019), orienteer

References

Estonian-language surnames